Lacarrière is a surname. Notable people with the surname include: 

Jacques Lacarrière (1925–2005), French writer
Jacques Lacarrière (ice hockey) (1906–2005), French ice hockey player
Philippe Lacarrière (born 1938), French ice hockey player and executive
Robert Lacarrière (1898–1970), French sailor